Vietnamese people in the Czech Republic, including citizens and non-citizens, are the third-largest ethnic minority in the country overall (after the Slovaks and Ukrainians), numbering more than 83,000 people according to the 2011 census.

It is the third-largest Vietnamese diaspora in Europe, and one of the most populous Vietnamese diasporas of the world.

According to the 2001 census, there were 17,462 ethnic Vietnamese in the Czech Republic. The Vietnamese population has grown very rapidly since then, with the Czech Statistics Office estimating that there were 62,842 Vietnamese citizens residing in the Czech Republic in December 2020 (not including those with Czech citizenship). Nguyen, the most common Vietnamese surname, is now the 9th most common surname in the entire country.

History

Vietnamese immigrants began settling in Czechoslovakia during the Communist period, when they were invited as guest workers by the Czechoslovak government. Migration was encouraged by Vietnamese authorities, in the hope that the migrants would return with skills and training.

Following the collapse of communism in Czechoslovakia, many Vietnamese people decided to remain in the country rather than return home. This first generation of immigrants has traditionally made a living as vendors in street markets or stalls. In recent years, however, a significant number have moved towards establishing their own businesses and integrating more broadly into society, similar to the experience of other overseas Vietnamese in Western countries. However, the small business sector remains the key economic domain of first-generation Vietnamese people in the Czech Republic.

Vietnamese immigration continued during the 1990s and 2000s, with Vietnam being one of the countries targeted by the Czech Republic's skilled migration programme.

Geography
The largest group of Vietnamese people (13,995 in 2020) lives in Prague, and 2% of the population of Karlovy Vary Region have Vietnamese citizenship, with the border town of Cheb being a main centre for Vietnamese people. Also the northernmost part of Bohemia – around the town of Varnsdorf – has a significant Vietnamese population.

Status

In the Czech Republic, national minorities are afforded classic national minority rights, including government funding for the protection of their language and culture. In recent years, the Vietnamese community has sought recognition as a national minority. In 2004, however, the Government Council for National Minorities, the advisory body of the Czech Government on the issues of national minorities, concluded that the Vietnamese do not constitute a "national minority", as this term only applies to indigenous minorities who have inhabited the Czech territory for a long period of time. Eventually in 2013, a representative of the Vietnamese was accepted as a member of the Government Council for National Minorities, which in the absence of precise legal criteria, has been understood as an official recognition of the Vietnamese ethnic minority as a national minority by both authorities and the public. In Prague, which has the largest community of Vietnamese, a Vietnamese representative had been a member of the city's National Minority Council and Vietnamese had been included in Prague's policy for national minorities before this happened at the national level.

Notable people
Monika Leová (born 1991), TV presenter and model, Czech Miss 2013
Filip Nguyen (born 1992), footballer
Thai Dai Van Nguyen (born 2001), chess grandmaster

See also
Czech Republic–Vietnam relations
Chinese people in the Czech Republic
Sapa – Vietnamese marketplace in Prague

Notes

External links
 Klub Hanoi - association promoting Vietnamese-Czech relations
A glimpse at Prague's secretive Vietnamese community
2004 article on Prague's Vietnamese community

Asian diaspora in the Czech Republic
Ethnic groups in the Czech Republic
Czech Republic